Soria ¡Ya! is a political party in the province of Soria, Castile and León, Spain. It was founded in 2001 to address the emerging Soria's demands for a fairer and more equal treatment as a result of the perceived institutional neglect to which it was placed by the different national and regional governments. In December 2021, it confirmed its electoral run in the 2022 Castilian-Leonese regional election as part of the Empty Spain (Spanish for España Vaciada) movement.

References

2001 establishments in Spain
Political parties established in 2001
Political parties in Castile and León
Regionalist parties in Spain